Tajewala Barrage is a now decommissioned but existing old barrage across the Yamuna River, located in Yamuna Nagar District, in the state of Haryana, India. Completed in 1873, it regulated the flow of the Yamuna for irrigation in Uttar Pradesh and Haryana through two canals originating at this place namely Western Yamuna Canal and Eastern Yamuna Canal, as well as the municipal water supply to Delhi.

Replaced by the Hathiinikund barrage
In 1999, the Hathnikund Barrage was completed to replace the aged Tajewala Barrage which is now out of service.

See also

 Blue Bird Lake, Hisar (city)
 Kaushalya Dam in Pinjore 
 Bhakra Dam
 Hathni Kund Barrage
 Okhla Barrage - Western Yamuna Canal begins here 
 Surajkund
 Indira Gandhi Canal
 Irrigation in India 
 Indian Rivers Inter-link
 Water transport in India
 Ganges Canal
 Ganges Canal (Rajasthan)
 Upper Ganges Canal Expressway
 List of dams and reservoirs in Haryana

External links
 Pollution in Yamuna river

References

Dams in Haryana
Dams on the Yamuna River
Yamunanagar district
Lakes of Haryana
Irrigation in Haryana
Dams completed in 1873
1873 establishments in India